Bolesław  (German Boleslau) is a village in the administrative district of Gmina Krzyżanowice, within Racibórz County, Silesian Voivodeship, in southern Poland, close to the Czech border.

The village has an approximate population of 460.

Gallery

References

Villages in Racibórz County